

2012 NAB Cup

2012 Australian Football League season

See also 
 2012 AFL season

External links
 AFL official site

Statistics and Results
 AlltheStats
 AFL Tables
 Final Siren with comprehensive AFL Statistics 1980–2008
 AFL Statistics by FootyWire
 Comprehensive & unique AFL Statistics by ProWess Sports
 Footystats Diary: AFL records/results/analysis plus news digest
 AFL on Austadiums
Major AFL news Sites
 Aussie Rules Latest News Headlines
 The Age Footy News
 Fox Sports Australia AFL news
 Herald Sun Footy News

History
 Full Points Footy

Western Bulldogs seasons
Western Bulldogs